The following is a list of the 21 cantons of the Orne department, in France, following the French canton reorganisation which came into effect in March 2015 (by alphabetical order):

 L'Aigle
 Alençon-1
 Alençon-2
 Argentan-1
 Argentan-2
 Athis-Val de Rouvre
 Bagnoles de l'Orne Normandie
 Bretoncelles
 Ceton
 Damigny
 Domfront en Poiraie
 Écouves
 La Ferté-Macé
 Flers-1
 Flers-2
 Magny-le-Désert
 Mortagne-au-Perche
 Rai
 Sées
 Tourouvre au Perche
 Vimoutiers

References